The Sassanid Empire or Sassanian Dynasty is the name used for the Persian dynasty which lasted from 224 to 651 AD.

 224 - Ardashir I introduces the title Šāhanšāh (king of kings); the Sasanid reign is founded.
 c. 224-240 – Zoroastrianism belief experiences an era of recovery under the reign of Ardashir I.
 230 - The Sassanian army assaults the Roman-controlled fraction of Upper Mesopotamia and lay hands on Nisibis, but fails to catch it.
 237-238 - Ardashir I begins another rushes on the Eastern Roman Provinces and occupies Harran and Nisibis.
 241 - Coronation of Shapur I.
 c. 242-273 - Mani makes a journey in Persia.
 252-256 - Shapur I moves forward to the Eastern Roman Provinces.
 c. 259 - Defeat and capture of Valerian by Shapur I.
 c. 260 - 2nd foray of the Eastern Roman Provinces by Shapur I.
 c. 261 - Odaenathus, the ruler of Palmyra, stops the triumphant Persian troops coming back home following the looting of Antioch, scores a notable conquest against Shapur I and drives the Persians back across the Euphrates.
 271 - Coronation of Hormizd I.
 273 - Coronation of Bahram I.
 274 or 277 - The execution of Mani by influential Zoroastrian high priest Kartir.
 276 - Coronation of Bahram II.

 276 - The Kartir is chosen as extreme power of the Zoroastrian place of worship and  victimizes the supporters of other believes; his engravings at Ka'ba-ye Zartosht, Naqsh-e Rajab, and Sar Mashhad (south of Kazerun) declare to prove his principles.
 283 - Roman Emperor Carus seizes Mesopotamia and catches Ctesiphon, but his troops comes back his unexpected passing.
 286 - Tiridates takes the Armenian throne and the Persians are discharged from there.
 293 - Narseh overwhelms his  competitors and triumphs to the Persian throne.

 c. 294 - Narseh’s Paikuli inscription in Iraq next to the Persian frontier.
 296 - Narseh raids Armenia, expels Tiridates, and quells the Romans.
 297- Roman Emperor Galerius undoes Narseh. The Treaty of Nisibis compels Narseh to abandon Armenia and Mesopotamia.
 c. 301 - The realm of Armenia is the first nation to accept Christianity as the state religion.
 302 - Resignation of Narseh; Coronation of Hormizd II.
 309 - Coronation of Shapur II.
 325 - Shapur II falls upon Arab people and makes impregnable the empire’s frontiers.
 338 - Shapur II retrieves the five regions gave in by Narseh to Rome.
 348 - Shapur II seizes Mesopotamia.
 c. 360 - Fondation of the Kidarite kingdom.
 363 - War between Julian and Persian troops follows his back off and demise; the surrendered territories and Nisibis are brought back to Persia.
 376 - The armistice signed by Rome and Persia.
 379 - Death of Shapur II and the accession of Ardashir II.
 383 - Coronation of Shapur III.
 399 - Coronation of Yazdegerd I, titled “the Sinner” owing to his efforts to control the influence of Zoroastrian clergy and his leniency towards other believes.
 409 - Christian are allowed to publicly worship and to construct churches.

 420 - Coronation of Bahram V (Bahram Gūr).
 421 - Peace between Persia and Rome comes to an end.
 422 - Bahram V triumphs in driving off an assault by the Hephtalites.
 c. 425 - Bahram V brings in gypsies from India to amuse people according to the Shahnameh.
 428 - Dissolution of Arsacid dynasty of Armenia. Establishment of Persian Armenia.
 438 - Coronation of Yazdegerd II.
 451 - Battle of Avarayr fought against the Christian Armenian rebels led by Vardan Mamikonian.
 457 - Coronation of Hormizd III.
 459 - Coronation of Peroz I.
 484 - Hephthalite Empire conquer Peroz I.
 484 - Coronation of Balash. The Nvarsak Treaty grants the Armenians the right to profess Christianity freely.
 488 - Coronation of Kavadh I; expedition against Khazars.
 c. 490 - Mazdak teaches his egalitarian ideology with the benefit of Kavadh I’s support.
 c. 490 - Initiation of agrarian and tax reforms.
 496 - Kavadh I is dethroned by his brother Djamasp.
 499 - Return of Kavadh I with support of Hephtalites.
 524 - War between Byzantine Empire and Sassanid Empire.
 526 - Romans assault Persia, Armenia, and Mesopotamia, however they are beaten. Start of the Iberian War.

 531 - Coronation of Khosrow I.
 c. 531 - Slaughter and crackdown of the Mazdak's followers.
 c. 531 - Farming, governmental, military, communal reforms.
 c. 531 - Conversion of Panchatantra, a Sanskrit-written book-story to Middle Persian. 
 533 - End of conflict between Persia and Byzantine Empire (the one that started in 524).
 541 - Lazic War commences between the Byzantines and the Sassanids for control over Lazica.
 c. 554 - Procopius, Byzantine expert and observer to the battles between Khosrow I and Justinian I, which he writes in his De bello Persico (Latin tr., 1833), dies.

 c. 570 - Conquest of Yemen.
 579 - Death of Khosrow I and the Coronation of Hormizd IV.
 580 - Sassanids abolish the monarchy of the Kingdom of Iberia. Direct control through self-appointed governors commences.
 588 - First Perso-Turkic War (with Göktürks) and their defeat at the hands of the Persian General Bahrām Chobin.
 590 - Hormizd IV is assassinated; Coronation of Khosrow II.
 590 - Uprising of Bahrām Chobin and his seizure of the Persian throne.
 591 - Overwhelming of Bahrām Chobin; he escapes to the Turks in Central Asia but is killed after a year. Khosrow II regains the throne with the help of the Byzantine Emperor Maurice.
 602 - Mutiny against the Emperor Maurice led by Phocas. Climactic Byzantine–Sasanian War of 602–628 commences.
 603 - Khosrow II’s invasion of Byzantium in revenge for the murder of Emperor Maurice and his relatives by the tyrant Phocas.
 611-616 - Khosrow II’s conquest of Syria and Egypt.
614 - Khosrow II takes Jerusalem; relics of the True Cross are carried off to Ctesiphon, capital of the Sasanian empire.
 622 - Heraclius mounts a counter-offensive against the Sasanians.
 626 - The Sassanids alongside the allied Avars and Slavs besiege the Byzantine capital, Constantinople
 627 - Heraclius defeats the troops of the Sasanian Empire near Nineveh.
 628 - Deposition, trial, and execution of Khosrow II by his son and successor Kavadh II (Shīrūya); peace concluded with Byzantine Empire.
 628 - Murdering of many Sasanian princes by Kavadh II.
 628 - Kavadh II dies.
 628-635 - Weakening of the Sasanian dynasty due to a succession of ineffectual kings and queens including the queens Boran and Azarmidokht; chaotic situation prevails.

 632 - Pond of Khumm event. 
 632 - The Prophet Moḥammad dies; there ensues a dispute over his succession.
 632-634 - Abu Bakr’s caliphate.
 633 - Yazdegerd III succeeds to the Persian throne.
 634 - Umar elected caliph; he plans a successful invasion of Byzantine and Persian (Sasanian) lands.
 635 - Arabs capture Damascus.
 635-641 - Arab troops capture Jerusalem, Antioch, Tripoli, and Egypt.
 636 - Persians are beaten by Arab Muslims at Qādisiyyah. 
 637 - Arab Muslims capture Ctesiphon, the Sasanian capital; Yazdegerd III escapes to Ray.
 637 - Arab Muslim conquest of Mesopotamia.
 642 - Final defeat of Persians by Arab Muslims at Nehavand.
 644 - Umar (Muslim caliph) is assassinated by Abu Lu'lu'a Firuz, a Persian captive slave.
 644-656 - Uthman’s caliphate.
 651 - Murder of Yazdegerd III; end of the Sasanian dynasty; Persia is annexed to the Rashidun Caliphate (Islamic Empire).

See also
 Timeline of Roman history

References 
 CHRONOLOGY OF IRANIAN HISTORY PART 1 iranicaonline.org 1 November 2015

Ancient timelines
Sasanian Empire